Astesanus of Asti (died c. 1330) was an important Franciscan  canon lawyer and theologian, from Asti in Piedmont. His major work is Summa de casibus conscientiae (Cases of conscience), a confessional work, in manuscript from around 1317 and comprising eight volumes and three indices. Its writing is said to have been at the prompting of Cardinal Giovanni Gaetano Orsini.

It is often referred to as the Summa Astesana. The parts named De significatione verborum are a reference for the legal usage of his period, for both civil and canon law. The Canones penitentiales are also cited separately.
It was printed at Strasbourg at the end of the 1460s by Johannes Mentelin, Lyons 1519; Rome 1728-30.

Works 
 Summa de casibus conscientiae. Johann Mentelin, Straßburg not after 1469 digital

References

J. Dietterle, Die "Summae confessorum (sive de casibus conscientiae)" von ihren Anfängen an bis Silvester Prierias, ZKG 26 (1905) 35-62.
P. Michaud-Quantin, Sommes casuistique et manuels de confession au moyen âge (Louvain - Lille - Montreal 1962) 57-60.
J. Sbaralea, Supplementum ad scriptores ordinis minorum I (Rome 1908) 104-05
On Astesanus cfr J.F. VON SCHULTE, Die Geschichte der Quellen und Literatur des canonischen Rechts von Gratian bis auf die Gegenwart. Zweiter Band. Die Geschichte der Quellen und Literatur des canonischen Rechts von Papst Gregor IX. bis zum Concil von Trent. SCHULTE, Geschichte, 2, § 103, p. 425-427; Ch. LEFEBVRE, ‘Formation du droit classique’, in LE BRAS a.o., Histoire du droit, 2ème Partie, p. 133-345, p. 322, J. GOERING, ‘The internal forum and the literature of penance and confession’, in W. HARTMANN, K. PENNINGTON (eds), The history of medieval canon law in the Classical Period, 1140-1234. From Gratian to the Decretals of pope Gregory IX, Washington, D.C., 2008, p. 424-425. For further bio-bibliographical reff. cfr WEILER, introduction to Arnoldi Gheylouen Roterodami Gnotosolitos Paruus e codice Seminarii Leodiensis 6 F 18 editus - cura et studio A. G. WEILER (CC CM, 212), Turnhout, 2008 p. CXXX

1330 deaths
Italian Franciscans
Canon law jurists
Year of birth unknown
14th-century Italian jurists
14th-century Latin writers